Tumakidae is a family of annelids belonging to the order Crassiclitellata.

Genera:
 Tumak Righi, 1995

References

Annelid families